This is a timeline documenting the events of heavy metal music in the year 1996.

Newly formed bands
3 Doors Down
 Ajattara
Alabama Thunderpussy
 Alien Ant Farm
Averse Sefira
Breed 77
Cattle Decapitation
Combatwoundedveteran
 Control Denied
The Crest
Daylight Dies
 Decapitated
Diabolic
Dornenreich
Drowning Pool
Ebony Tears
 Flaw (as F.law)
Gardenian
Goatsnake
 God Forbid
 Gojira
The Haunted
Heaven Shall Burn
 Hibria
Into Eternity 
Iron Savior
Kiss It Goodbye
Kittie
 Linkin Park (as Xero)
Manticora
Maudlin of the Well
MD.45
Mudvayne
Nargaroth
Narnia
Nashville Pussy
 Nightwish
Nocturnal Breed
Norther
Omnium Gatherum
Orden Ogan
Pain 
Penumbra  
Prayer for Cleansing
Queens of the Stone Age
Racetraitor
Saliva  
 Samsas Traum
Sculptured
Shining 
The Sins of Thy Beloved
Soulburn
Spineshank
Spirit Caravan
Stam1na
Training for Utopia
Trans-Siberian Orchestra
Tvangeste
Two
Ultraspank
 uneXpect
The Union Underground
 Within Temptation
Yob

Albums

 24-7 Spyz - 6 (alternate version released in America as Heavy Metal Soul by the Pound)
 24-7 Spyz - Heavy Metal Soul by the Pound (alternate version released in Europe as 6)
 Accept - Predator
 Acid Bath - Paegan Terrorism Tactics
 Alice in Chains - Unplugged (live)
 Altar - Ego Art
 Amon Amarth - Sorrow Throughout the Nine Worlds (EP)
 Amorphis - Elegy
 Anathema – Eternity
 Angelcorpse - Hammer of Gods
 Angra - Holy Land
 Angra - Freedom Call (EP) 
 Antidote - Mind Alive
 Anvil (band) – Plugged in Permanent
 Apocalyptica - Plays Metallica by Four Cellos
 Arch Enemy - Black Earth
 Arcturus - Aspera Hiems Symfonia
 Asphyx - God Cries
 Asphyx - Embrace the Death (recorded in 1990)
 Ayreon - Actual Fantasy
 Bathory - Blood on Ice
 Behemoth - Grom
 Biohazard - Mata Leão
 Borknagar - Borknagar
 Bruce Dickinson - Skunkworks
 Brutality - In Mourning
 Brutal Truth - Kill Trend Suicide
 Cannibal Corpse - Vile
 Cathedral - Supernatural Birth Machine
 Civil Defiance - The Fishers For Souls
 Converge - Petitioning the Empty Sky
 Corrosion of Conformity - Wiseblood
 Cradle of Filth - V Empire or Dark Faerytales in Phallustein (EP)
 Cradle of Filth - Dusk... and Her Embrace
 Crowbar - Broken Glass 
 Cryptopsy - None So Vile
 The Cult – High Octane Cult
 Danzig – Danzig 5: Blackacidevil
 Dark Funeral - The Secrets of the Black Arts
 Dawn - Sorgh på Svarte Vingar Fløgh
 Deep Purple - Purpendicular
 Def Leppard - Slang
 Desultory - Swallow the Snake
 DGeneration – No Lunch
 Dimmu Borgir - Stormblåst
 Dio - Angry Machines
 Downset. - Do We Speak a Dead Language?
 Drain STH – Horror Wrestling
 Dying Fetus - Purification Through Violence
 Earth Crisis - Gomorrah's Season Ends
 Edge of Sanity - Crimson
 Eyehategod - Dopesick
 Far - Tin Cans with Strings to You
 FireHouse – Good Acoustics
 Forbidden - Green
 Freak Kitchen - Spanking Hour
 Fu Manchu - In Search Of...
 Godflesh - Songs of Love and Hate
 Gorefest - Soul Survivor
 Gorgoroth - Antichrist
 Grave - Hating Life
 Grinspoon - Licker Bottle Cozy (EP)
 Helloween - The Time of the Oath
 Hypocrisy - Abducted
 Hypocrisy - Maximum Abduction (EP)
 Immolation - Here in After
 In Flames - The Jester Race
 Iced Earth - The Dark Saga
 Integrity – Humanity is the Devil
 King Diamond - The Graveyard
 Kataklysm - Temple of Knowledge
 Katatonia - Brave Murder Day
 Korn - Life Is Peachy
 Korpse - Revirgin
 Kvist - For Kunsten Maa Vi Evig Vike
 L.A. Guns – American Hardcore
 Tony MacAlpine - Violent Machine
 Madball - Demonstrating My Style
 Manowar - Louder Than Hell
 Marduk - Heaven Shall Burn... When We Are Gathered
 Marilyn Manson - Antichrist Superstar
 Mercyful Fate - Into the Unknown
 Metallica - Load
 Ministry - Filth Pig
 Monstrosity - Millennium
 Moonspell - Irreligious
 Morgana Lefay - Maleficium
 Morgoth - Feel Sorry for the Fanatic
 Mortician - Hacked Up for Barbecue
 Mortification - EnVision EvAngelene
 Motörhead - Overnight Sensation
 My Dying Bride - Like Gods of the Sun
 Napalm Death - Diatribes
 Necrophobic – Spawned by Evil (EP)
 Nevermore - The Politics of Ecstasy
 Neurosis - Through Silver in Blood
 Occult – The Enemy Within
 Old Man's Child - Born of the Flickering
 Orange 9mm - Tragic
 Orphanage - By Time Alone
 Oomph! - Wunschkind
 Opeth - Morningrise
 Overkill – The Killing Kind
 Pantera - The Great Southern Trendkill
 Pan.Thy.Monium - Khaooohs and Kon-Fus-Ion 
 Pitchshifter - Infotainment?
 P.O.D. - Brown
 Poison - Poison's Greatest Hits: 1986–1996 (compilation)
 Iggy Pop – Nude & Rude: The Best of Iggy Pop
 Pro-Pain – Contents Under Pressure
 Prong - Rude Awakening
 Quo Vadis - Forever...
 Rage - Lingua Mortis (four re-recorded songs from the album Black in Mind, with arrangements for a classic orchestra)
 Rage - End of All Days
 Rage Against the Machine - Evil Empire
 Rotting Christ - Triarchy of the Lost Lovers
 Rush - Test for Echo
 Sacred Reich - Heal
 Samael - Passage
 Satyricon - Nemesis Divina
 Scorpions – Pure Instinct
 Sepultura - Roots
 Sentenced - Down
 Soundgarden - Down on the Upside
 Slayer - Undisputed Attitude
 Slipknot - Mate. Feed. Kill. Repeat. (demo)
 Staind - Tormented
 Steelheart – Wait
 Stone Temple Pilots – Tiny Music... Songs from the Vatican Gift Shop
 Stratovarius - Episode
 Stuck Mojo - Pigwalk
 Summoning - Dol Guldur
 Theatre of Tragedy - Velvet Darkness They Fear
 The 3rd and the Mortal - Painting on Glass
 The Hellacopters – Supershitty to the Max!
 Therion - Theli
 Thorr's Hammer - Dommedagsnatt (EP)
 Tool - Ænima
 Type O Negative - October Rust
 Steve Vai - Fire Garden
 Vader - Future of the Past
 Van Halen - Best Of – Volume I (compilation)
 Vision of Disorder - Vision of Disorder
 Warrant - Belly to Belly
 Warrant – The Best of Warrant
 Xentrix - Scourge
 Zakk Wylde – Book of Shadows

Disbandments
 Beherit
 Carnis
 Damn Yankees
 Down
 Extreme
 Prong
 Sexart
 Skid Row
 Trouble

Events
 Alice in Chains plays their last concert with Layne Staley on July 23, 1996. They later go on hiatus until April 20, 2002, in which Staley is found dead in his apartment after overdosing on a speedball.
Body Count drummer Beatmaster V dies of leukemia.
The first Ozzfest tour sets off, with headliners Ozzy Osbourne, Slayer and Danzig.
 The original line-up of KISS (Ace Frehley, Gene Simmons, Peter Criss, Paul Stanley) come back together.
Bassist Greg Christian of Testament left the band, leaving guitarist Eric Peterson as the sole ever-present in the line-up.
Slash leaves Guns N' Roses, citing differences with Axl Rose
Sammy Hagar departs Van Halen after a feud with Eddie Van Halen. Van Halen briefly reunites with David Lee Roth at a highly publicized event at the MTV Video Music Awards, but fires him shortly thereafter.
Tim 'Ripper' Owens fills the void left by Rob Halford in 1993 as lead singer of Judas Priest.

References

1990s in heavy metal music
Metal